Vera Poska-Grünthal (1898–1986) was a leading Estonian feminist. She was one of the founders of the International Federation of Women Lawyers (IFWL), an International Non-Governmental Organization (NGO) that enhances the status of women and children by providing legal aid, legal literacy and education programs, and through advocacy, law reform, research and publications. She also founded the Estonian-language journal Triinu in Sweden in 1952, serving as its editor until 1981.

Further reading
Vera Poska-Grünthal, in: A Biographical Dictionary of Women's Movements and Feminisms in Central, Eastern, and South Eastern Europe 19th and 20th Centuries. Budapest, New York: CEU Press. S. 450-454, by Sirje Tamul.
Jaan Poska tütar jutustab. Mälestusi oma isast ja elust vanemate kodus by Vera Poska-Grünthal and Jaan Poska (1969) 
See oli Eestis 1919-1944 by Vera Poska-Grünthal  (1975)
Elu jätkub võõrsil by Vera Poska-Grünthal  (1985)

References

1898 births
1986 deaths
Estonian feminists
20th-century Estonian lawyers
University of Tartu alumni
Estonian women lawyers
20th-century women lawyers